Paris Saint-Germain Féminine, commonly referred to as Paris Saint-Germain, Paris SG, or simply Paris or PSG, are a French professional football club based in Paris.  Founded in 1971, they compete in Division 1 Féminine, the top division of French football. Their home ground is the Stade Jean-Bouin. They are the women's department of Paris Saint-Germain.

PSG have played in the top flight since 2001, when they won the Division 2 title. The Parisians won their first major honour, the Coupe de France, in 2010. This trophy, coupled with the club's takeover, signalled the start of a new era. PSG went from being a mid-table side to becoming one of the best teams in European football. The Red and Blues have since been crowned Division 1 champions for the first time in 2021, won two more cup titles in 2018 and 2022, and reached the UEFA Women's Champions League final twice.

The club's home kit colours are red, blue and white. PSG's crest features the Eiffel Tower and a fleur de lys. PSG have an intense rivalry with Olympique Lyonnais. The duo contest French football's most notorious match, known as Le Classique. They also have a strong rivalry with Paris FC, a fixture referred to as the Parisian Derby.

Tamim bin Hamad Al Thani, ruler of Qatar, owns parent club Paris Saint-Germain through state-owned shareholding organization Qatar Sports Investments (QSI), which purchased the club in 2011. The takeover made PSG the richest club in France and one of the wealthiest in the world. QSI took control of the women's team in 2012.

History

Foundation and rise to Division 1 (1971–2001)

A year after the foundation of the club, Paris Saint-Germain created their women's section in the summer of 1971 after the French Football Federation (FFF) gave the green light to female football. PSG signed 33 women for the 1971–72 season and the newly formed team began life in the Ligue de Paris Île-de-France, the lowest level of the football pyramid. They finished second that campaign, their best result ever, and continued life in the Parisian championship for seven more years, albeit with less success.

Ahead of the 1979–80 season, PSG were promoted to the top flight of French football, the Division 1, after it went from 20 to 48 teams. Their inaugural stint, however, only lasted three seasons, and PSG were relegated back to Division 2 in 1982. The Red and Blues bounced between the two top divisions over the next 19 years. Following a dramatic 1999–2000 season in which they missed promotion to the elite by losing their last match against promotion contenders Schiltigheim, PSG finally steadied the ship in 2001. Led by coach Sébastien Thierry and young defender Laura Georges, the team won 16 out of 18 games played in Group A to claim back their place amongst the best in France. PSG would then clinch the 2000–01 Division 2 title by defeating Group C leader Tours in the final. Since then, Paris SG have never been relegated from Division 1.

From mid-table team to first major title (2001–2010)

Under incoming manager Cyril Combettes, Paris Saint-Germain remained without major problems in Division 1 but nowhere near the top teams. In the summer of 2005, starlets Sabrina Delannoy and Laure Boulleau signed from CNFE Clairefontaine. Together, they played more than 400 matches with PSG, being their two most capped players. The defending duo experienced everything with the capital side: relegation battles, mid-table finishes, title races and the club's first major trophy. Men and women confounded, Delannoy is PSG's sixth most capped player ever, only behind male counterparts Jean-Marc Pilorget, Sylvain Armand, Safet Sušić, Paul Le Guen and Marco Verratti.

At the end of March 2007, Cyril Combettes resigned due to relationship problems with the players. He was replaced by Eric Leroy for the 2007–08 season. Despite a difficult start, including a heavy defeat to Montpellier in the first match, the season was a success. Under Leroy's direction, the team finished in fifth place and reached their maiden Challenge de France final. Having crashed out at the same stage in 2005, the Red and Blues learned their lesson and defeated Parisian Derby rivals Paris FC (at the time called Juvisy) in the semi-finals. Olympique Lyonnais, however, proved too strong for PSG in the title-decider at the Stade de France, easily taking home the cup with three unanswered strikes.

Following a disappointing 2008–09 season, Camillo Vaz replaced Éric Leroy in June 2009. PSG recruited French internationals Élise Bussaglia, Julie Soyer and Jessica Houara during that summer. The women's team then celebrated their 38th birthday by making their debut at the Parc des Princes. Usually reserved for the men's side, PSG hosted city rivals Paris FC at the stadium on October 18, 2009. In front of 5,892 spectators, they defeated their guests thanks to an early goal from Camille Abily. The 2009–10 campaign ended with a third place, a first for them on the podium. Better yet, the Parisians also reached their second Challenge de France final after eliminating juggernauts Lyon in the semi-finals.

Noilhan had left the club shortly before the final, leaving Vaz as the sole coach. This, however, did not stop PSG from crushing defending champions Montpellier at the Stade Robert Bobin to claim their first major title as well as their second trophy ever and their first since 2001. Emblematic club striker Ingrid Boyeldieu, who would retire at the end of the season, opened the scoring in the first half. After the break, PSG added four more goals for a brutal 5–0 scoreline, the largest victory in the history of cup finals.

European debut and Qatari takeover (2010–2013)

The 2010–11 season marked a turning point for Paris. In the summer, Brazilian star Kátia joined on a free signing from Lyon. PSG finished league runners-up behind heavyweights Olympique Lyonnais and qualified to the UEFA Women's Champions League for the first time in their history. The Parisians dramatically defeated second-placed Montpellier in the final game of the season, with team captain Sabrina Delannoy scoring the winning penalty in stoppage time. Élise Bussaglia was named Division 1 Féminine Player of the Season.

Exempted from the group stage, PSG made their European debut by comfortably eliminating Irish side Peamount in the Round of 16, before being themselves ousted by German giants and future finalists 1. FFC Frankfurt. The rest of the 2011–12 campaign, however, was not as successful. Undermined by the injuries of key players Léa Rubio, Laure Lepailleur and Caroline Pizzala, the team lost its grip and finished in fourth place after suffering a heavy defeat at home to Île-de-France rivals Paris FC. As a result, coach Camillo Vaz left the club at the end of the season.

PSG bounced back immediately with the professionalisation of the team by new club owners Qatar Sports Investments (QSI) ahead of the 2012–13 campaign. They spent big to build a team capable of competing with the best clubs in France and Europe, including Lyon, and signed its 21 players to a federal contract, something unprecedented in women's football. Renowned international players Shirley Cruz, Kosovare Asllani, Annike Krahn and Linda Bresonik were the first to arrive, as well as Farid Benstiti, the coach who guided Lyon to four consecutive league titles. A season later, PSG recruited Marie-Laure Delie, the first women's football transfer in France, for €50k. As part of this revolution, PSG also moved to the Stade Sébastien Charléty in 2012 and then to the Stade Jean-Bouin in 2018, abandoning the smaller Stade Municipal Georges Lefèvre, which had been their home stadium since 1971.

Power struggle with Lyon and second cup title (2013–2018)

These investments allowed PSG to challenge Olympique Lyonnais, with the duo developing a heated rivalry dubbed as Le Classique. Lyon still kept a head start over Paris during the 2010s, clinching a record 14 consecutive league titles between 2007 and 2020. PSG managed a few important victories during that time, though. League and cup runners-up behind Lyon in 2013–14, they recorded their first ever win over the champions in January 2014, with a solitary goal from Laura Georges at the Stade de Gerland. It was Lyon's first league defeat at home since March 2010, an unbeaten streak spanning 87 matches.

PSG repeated the feat in 2014–15, this time in the Champions League, as Fatmire Alushi scored the only goal at Gerland to eliminate Lyon in the last 16. Nonetheless, the season ended in disappointment; Paris finished second to Lyon and lost the 2015 UEFA Women's Champions League Final to Frankfurt at the last second. Lyon retaliated in 2015–16 by claiming the championship and then crushing PSG in the Champions League semi-finals. They scored seven times without response, inflicting PSG's biggest defeat in the continental competition and one of their biggest ever. Even worse, Paris finished third in the league and missed qualification to the Champions League. The club did not renew Farid Benstiti's contract and was replaced by Patrice Lair, another former Lyon coach.

The two sides were back at it again in 2016–17. PSG first beat their rivals, also by a 1–0 margin, in December 2016 despite Lyon still managing to retain the league title. Then, they crossed paths in the French Cup final, won by Lyon after an endless penalty shoot-out, and in the 2017 UEFA Women's Champions League Final, which also had to be decided on penalties. The teams could not be separated after seven kicks each until PSG goalkeeper Katarzyna Kiedrzynek stepped up and missed. Her counterpart Sarah Bouhaddi converted her effort and handed Lyon the European victory. With Bernard Mendy on the bench, filling in after the surprise departure of Lair, the capital outfit exacted revenge on Lyon in the 2017–18 season by defeating them in the French Cup final in May 2018, with a solitary goal from French international striker Marie-Antoinette Katoto.

Maiden league championship and third cup triumph (2018–present)

Olivier Echouafni was named manager in June 2018, while Mendy stayed on as his assistant. Paris finished league runners-up in 2018–19 and 2019–20, while losing the French Cup and French Super Cup titles to Lyon as well. In Echouafni's third season in charge, PSG ended Lyon's 80-game unbeaten league streak in November 2020 to leapfrog them and go top of the table. Once more, Katoto scored the lone goal of a game played behind closed doors at the Parc des Princes. The Parisians then held on for a crucial goalless draw away at Lyon in the penultimate game and beat Dijon in the final match to win the Division 1 crown for the first time and end their rivals' run of 14 consecutive league titles. They also ended Lyon's stranglehold on the Champions League with a stunning quarterfinal comeback to prevent their rivals from a sixth consecutive European title. They were, however, eliminated by Barcelona in the semifinals.

In the 2021–22 season, featuring yet another face-off with Lyon, the capital side failed to defend their crown, losing both league ties by an aggregate score of 7–1. PSG hit back in the French Cup, ousting Lyon at the last-16 stage (3–0) and then cruising to their third cup title with an 8–0 win over second-tier side Yzeure in the final. Lyon had the last word, though, eliminating Paris from the Champions League semi-finals 5–3 on aggregate on their way to another continental triumph.

Identity

Parent club Paris Saint-Germain represent both the city of Paris and the nearby royal town of Saint-Germain-en-Laye. As a result, red, blue and white are the club's traditional colours. The red and blue are Parisian colours, a nod to revolutionary figures Lafayette and Jean Sylvain Bailly, and the white is a symbol of French royalty and Saint-Germain-en-Laye.

On the club's crest, the Eiffel Tower in red and the blue background represent Paris, while the fleur de lys in white is a hint to the coat of arms of Saint-Germain-en-Laye. The fleur de lys is a royal symbol as well and recalls that French King Louis XIV was born in the town. Throughout its history, PSG have brandished several different crests, but all of them have featured the club's three historical colours. Likewise, PSG's most iconic shirts have been predominantly red, blue or white, with the remaining two colours included as well. The club's official mascot, Germain the Lynx, also sports PSG's traditional colours.

Grounds

Stadiums

Between 1971 and 2012, Paris Saint-Germain played their home matches at the Stade Municipal Georges Lefèvre, located in Saint-Germain-en-Laye, just across the street from the Camp des Loges, the training center of the club's male football section. When the team professionalised ahead of the 2012–13 season, PSG relocated to the 20,000-seater Stade Sébastien Charléty. They returned to the Georges Lefèvre for the 2017–18 campaign, before moving out again at the start of the 2018–19 season to the 20,000-capacity Stade Jean-Bouin, located across the street from Parc des Princes, home to the men's first football team. Ever since then, only a few matches have been relocated to the Georges Lefèvre.

The women's team also have occasionally played at the Parc des Princes, usually reserved for games of the men's side. They made their debut on October 18, 2009, defeating Parisian Derby rivals Paris FC (previously Juvisy) in front of 5,892 spectators. The stadium was also used during the 2014–15 and 2016–17 UEFA Women's Champions League campaigns. In November 2020, they beat Le Classique arch-rivals Olympique Lyonnais at the Parc. The ladies have won five of their six games played at the stadium, with the remaining match ending in defeat.

Training facilities

Paris Saint-Germain currently train at the Centre Sports et Loisirs de la Banque de France de Bougival. The Camp des Loges will become the training ground of the women's first team and academy in 2022. Their male counterparts will move to the Paris Saint-Germain Training Center. The new venue will have its own stadium. With a total capacity of 5,000, including over 3,000 seats, the arena will host some of the women's games in official competitions such as the Division 1 Féminine and UEFA Women's Champions League.

Records and statistics

Since their inception, Paris Saint-Germain have played 50 seasons, all of them within the top three levels of the French football league system: Division 1, Division 2 and Ligue de Paris Île-de-France. PSG began life in the Ligue de Paris in 1971–72, playing regional league football during eight seasons. They were promoted to Division 1 for the first time ahead of the 1979–80 campaign and have now played 30 seasons in the top flight. PSG have been relegated to Division 2 three times, playing a total of twelve seasons in the second tier. They returned to Division 1 in 2001–02 and have never looked back since. The club's worst D1 finish to date is 12th, its placing at the end of the 1994–95 season.

PSG have won four titles. Domestically, the capital side have clinched one Division 1 championship, three French Cups and one Division 2 title. In international club football, PSG have reached the UEFA Champions League final twice (2015 and 2017). Additionally, PSG have won one unofficial title. Influential officials and players in the club's history include most decorated president Nasser Al-Khelaifi, trophy-winning managers Sébastien Thierry, Camillo Vaz, Bernard Mendy, Olivier Echouafni and Didier Ollé-Nicolle, record appearance maker and longest-serving captain Sabrina Delannoy, and all-time top scorer Marie-Antoinette Katoto.

Supporters

Between 2010 and 2016, with the impossibility of supporting the men's team at home or away, the ultras turned to the women's team, and to a lesser extent to the Paris Saint-Germain Academy sides, being the very rare case of fan groups attending games of their club's women's team. Liberté Pour les Abonnés and Nautecia, which were among several groups that reunited Boulogne and Auteuil supporters, were behind this initiative. PSG ultras have also occasionally attended big matches of Paris Saint-Germain Handball, the club's handball team.

Unlike some fans who switched allegiance to other Parisian clubs such as Paris FC or Créteil, Liberté Pour les Abonnés and Nautecia chose to stay with PSG by supporting the women in France and abroad, from league clashes against rivals Lyon to the 2014–15 UEFA Women's Champions League semifinals versus Wolfsburg and the grand finale in Berlin, where they narrowly lost to Eintracht Frankfurt (2–1).

A marriage of convenience at first, the ultras began to really enjoy supporting the women for three main reasons: their proximity compared to the men, being able to easily approach female players; their appreciation for the fans, always thanking them after every match; and their solidarity with the ultra movement, publicly supporting a return to the Parc des Princes for men's team games in interviews and social media, in contrast to male players whose communication was more controlled by the club.

The ultras have also continued to support the women's side since their return to the stadium under the banner of the Collectif Ultras Paris (CUP). During the club's 2016–17 UEFA Women's Champions League campaign, they were at the Parc des Princes for the quarterfinals and semifinals versus Bayern Munich and Barcelona respectively. 300 ultras then travelled to Cardiff in June 2017 to cheer the team at the final, which PSG lost to Lyon in the penalty shootout (0–0; 7–6 on penalties).

Despite their protests against the management and the attitude of male players in 2022, the CUP were still behind the "exemplary" women's team. They went en masse to the Parc des Princes for the 2021–22 UEFA Women's Champions League quarterfinals against Bayern Munich in March, and then for the semifinals versus Lyon in April. In the latter match, the ultras were part of the club record 43,254 spectators in attendance. Before kick-off, they unfurled a banner reading: "Proud of our colors and proud of our female players."

Rivalries

Paris Saint-Germain shares an intense rivalry with Olympique Lyonnais; matches between the two teams are referred to as Le Classique. It is the female version of the rivalry between parent club Paris Saint-Germain and Olympique de Marseille in men's football, also called Le Classique. Lyon have been the dominant force in French and European football ever since their foundation in 2004, being champions of the Division 1 Féminine in 14 consecutive seasons between 2007 and 2020 as well as winning the UEFA Women's Champions League seven times, five of which were in a row. On the other hand, PSG only began to challenge Lyon's hegemony after 2012, when Qatar Sports Investments (QSI) took over the team. Now with serious financial backing, Paris became a team capable of competing with the best clubs in the world, including Lyon, and thus a fierce rivalry emerged between the two sides in the 2010s.

The Red and Blues also have a strong rivalry with fellow Île-de-France outfit Paris FC (called Juvisy until 2017). Known as the Parisian Derby, the duo compete for recognition as the capital's top team. Prior to the appearance of Lyon in the 2000s and the rise of PSG into an elite club in the 2010s, Paris FC were the biggest team in the land and usually had the upper hand against their city rivals. They were the last side to win the league title, aside from Lyon in 2006, before PSG claimed their first crown in 2021. Nowadays, PSG dominate the derby thanks to the huge gulf created between them by the investment of their Qatari owners, while Paris FC are trying to establish themselves as France's third team.

Ownership and finances

Tamim bin Hamad Al Thani, ruler of Qatar, bought 70% of parent club Paris Saint-Germain in June 2011 through state-owned shareholding organization Qatar Sports Investments (QSI). In March 2012, QSI purchased the remaining 30% stake to become PSG's sole shareholder, valuing the club at €100m. PSG thus became one of the wealthiest clubs in the world.

In late June 2019, Paris Saint-Germain announced a long-term contract extension with kit manufacturer Nike, which is now one of European football's most lucrative and the biggest sponsorship agreement in the club's history. The Parisians are now tied to the Swoosh company until 2032 with an annual figure of €80 million. The new deal covers the men's and women's football teams as well as their handball outfit.

Honours

As of the end of the 2021–22 season.

 
  shared record

Players

As of 31 January 2023.

First-team squad

Out on loan

Personnel

As of 9 August 2022.

Management

Technical staff

References

External links

Official websites
PSG.FR - Site officiel du Paris Saint-Germain
Paris Saint-Germain (Women) - UEFA.com

 
Women's football clubs in France
Paris Saint-Germain F.C.
1971 establishments in France
Association football clubs established in 1971
Division 1 Féminine clubs
Football clubs in Paris